The 2019 Wokingham Borough Council election took place on Thursday 2 May 2019. That was the same day as other United Kingdom local elections in order to elect members of Wokingham Unitary Council in Berkshire, England. One third of the council was up for election.

Before the election, the composition of the council was:
Conservative 41
Liberal Democrat 8
Labour 3
Independent 2

Background
Since the previous round of elections in 2018, there had been 1 by-election, in Evendons in February 2019, which had been won by the Liberal Democrats. Richard Dolinski resigned from the Conservative Party to sit as an independent as a result of an internal vote of no confidence being put forward and subsequently passed against Cllr Charlotte Haitham-Taylor which led to her resignation as the Leader of the Council

The composition of the council before the election was as follows:

After the election, the composition of the council became:

Election result

A total of 39,148 votes were cast for candidates.

Ward results

There were 17 spoiled ballots.

There were 49 spoiled ballot papers.

There were 21 spoiled ballot papers.

There were 16 spoiled ballot papers.

There were 16 spoiled ballots.

 

There were 25 spoiled ballots.

There were 44 spoiled ballots.

There were 42 spoiled ballots.

There were 49 spoiled ballots.

There were 59 spoiled ballots.

There were 11 spoiled ballots.

There were 11 spoiled ballots.

There were 12 spoiled ballots.

There were 27 spoiled ballots.

There were 19 spoiled ballots.

There were 27 spoiled ballots.

There were 24 spoiled ballots.

There were 55 spoiled ballots.

References

2019
2019 English local elections
2010s in Berkshire
May 2019 events in the United Kingdom